Jeemangalam is a village in the Hosur taluk of Krishnagiri district, Tamil Nadu, India. It is located at the 8th km from Hosur towards Malur.

References 

 

Villages in Krishnagiri district